Black Friday is a 2004 Indian Hindi-language crime film written and directed by Anurag Kashyap. Based on Black Friday: The True Story of the Bombay Bomb Blasts, a book by Hussain Zaidi about the 1993 Bombay bombings, it chronicles the events that led to the blasts and the subsequent police investigation. Produced by Arindam Mitra of Mid-Day, the film stars Kay Kay Menon, Aditya Srivastava, Pavan Malhotra, Kishor Kadam and Zakir Hussain.

Mitra, director of operations for Mid Day, approached Kashyap with the book and wanted him to write a television series based on it for the Aaj Tak TV news channel. Kashyap wrote the script in episodes for the six-part miniseries but later felt a feature film was more appropriate for the topic. Aaj Tak backed away from the project, and it was shelved. Kashyap then suggested to the director Aditya Bhattacharya that he make it into a film. When Kashyap told him he felt there was a film to be made about the event, Bhattacharya gave it to him to direct. The film's soundtrack album and the background score were composed by the band Indian Ocean, while the lyrics were written by Piyush Mishra. Natarajan Subramaniam served as the director of photography, while Aarti Bajaj was its editor.

Black Friday premiered at the 2004 Locarno International Film Festival and was supposed to be released the same year in India. However, after a petition filed by a group accused of the 1993 bomb blasts challenging the film's release, the Bombay High Court issued a stay. Until judgement was delivered on the case, it could not be released. On 9 February 2007, after the verdict was announced, the Supreme Court of India allowed its release. The film received critical acclaim. It won the Grand Jury Prize at the Indian Film Festival of Los Angeles and was a nominee for the Golden Leopard award at the Locarno International Film Festival.

Plot
On 9 March 1993, a small-time thug, Gul Mohammed, is detained at the Nav Pada police station in Bombay and confesses to a conspiracy underway to bomb major locations around the city. The police dismiss his confession as bluff and three days later, a series of explosions take place in the city, leaving 257 dead and close to 1400 injured. Investigators discover the bombs, made of RDX, were smuggled into the city with the aid of customs officials and the border police.

Tiger Memon is an underworld don whose office is burned during the Bombay riots. The persecution of Muslim minorities in the riots leads to a meeting of underworld leaders in Dubai who take it upon themselves to seek retribution. Memon suggests an attack on Bombay would send the strongest message of retaliation.

Asgar Muqadam, his secretary, is arrested on 14 March 1993. He is beaten until he provides whatever information he has about the bomb blasts. This initiates a full-scale police inquiry. Deputy Commissioner of Police, Rakesh Maria, is put in charge of the case. Badshah Khan, one of the henchmen who had left Bombay and gone into hiding, is arrested by the police on 10 May 1993. Following the blast, accomplices to the crime are forced to lead a life of anonymity and secrecy as it becomes evident the Mumbai police have begun picking up the suspects one by one. To make matters worse, their passports seem to have been destroyed at the behest of Memon.

Despite assurances to the contrary, the high command blatantly refuses any help once the bombings have occurred. Tired of being let down by his own people, and without a place to hide, Badshah Khan realises there is no justification for his acts and decides to become a police witness. On 4 November 1993, the police file a charge sheet against 189 accused. The Central Bureau of Investigation takes over the case. On 5 August 1994, Tiger's brother, Yaqub Memon, willingly turns himself in to the authorities. In a candid Newstrack interview on national television, Yaqub states that it was Tiger and his underworld associates who orchestrated the conspiracy.

Cast

Production

On 12 March 1993, a series of 12 bomb blasts took place in Mumbai, Maharashtra. The attacks were carried out in retaliation for the Bombay riots that occurred earlier in the year. They resulted in 257 deaths and 713 injuries. Anurag Kashyap's feature film directorial debut Paanch ran into censorship trouble and had been shelved when Arindam Mitra, director of operations for Mid-Day, approached him with the book Black Friday: The True Story of the Bombay Bomb Blasts written by Hussain Zaidi, their chief crime correspondent. He wanted Kashyap to write a television series based on it for Aaj Tak, to be directed by Aditya Bhattacharya. Kashyap read an unedited version of the book, which had not been released at that point, and was "fascinated" by it. He wrote the script in episodes for the mini series but later felt it was better suited as a feature film.

Aaj Tak backed off from the project after their executives read the first episode and the project was abandoned. Kashyap then suggested Bhattacharya to make it into a film to which Bhattacharya offered him to direct instead. Zaidi wrote the book following three years of research on the subject. Kashyap researched for a year, including attending court to see how criminals look and to observe how court procedures work. He discovered criminals look normal and cast his actors based on this observation. The film's characters are all real people, including: Kay Kay Menon playing investigating officer Rakesh Maria, Pawan Malhotra as Tiger Memon and Aditya Srivastava as Badshah Khan, the police approver who helped them crack the case. Filmmaker Imtiaz Ali portrayed the role of Yakub Memon. To get their perspective, Kashyap also read Voices, a book recommended by Zaidi, which includes the testimony of several individuals who were arrested. He asked Devashish Makhija, who was his assistant director, to do the research. Makhija described the research material he found, and Kashyap continued to write. This resulted in the script being completed in 36 hours.

To recreate several of the film's locations, Kashyap watched actual footage from the government's Film Division, read all the newspapers describing the incident, and looked at press photographs. The most challenging thing for the crew, since the film was being shot in 2003, was to recreate 1993 when there were no cell phones or satellite television in India. The film was shot on the streets of Mumbai to avoid modern cars. It could not be shot from low angles because the hoardings and neon signs were contemporary. The crew had to make sure there were no mobile phones visible in the film. Kashyap said in an interview that he needed the city and had to "trim" it: "I shot mostly from the top angle and focused on my characters. There was a lot of guerrilla type shooting where nobody in the city came to know-we shot with hidden cameras. The police were [sic] supportive, Mid Day was at the job for permissions and all those things." He retained the actual names of people in the film who were involved in the blast.

Kashyap shot the film without permission on actual locations. In the film, Dawood's house was shot in three locations including Dubai and Lonavala. Because of the film's low-budget, the crew slept inside buses at night, shot the film during the day and moved to the next location. Kashyap shot at Behrampura, the site where the actual bomb was planted, using two hidden cameras, while the crew used walkie-talkies to communicate to avoid attracting a crowd. The film's principal photography began in October 2003 and was completed in 70 days. A twelve-minute police chase sequence in the film was improvised and shot in the Dharavi slums. It was neither in the script nor in the book. Kashyap wanted it because he felt it was boring to show normal arrests. He also wanted to use the chase to show the criminals' background and the exhaustion of the police. Natarajan Subramaniam served as the director of photography, while Aarti Bajaj was the editor.

Soundtrack

The band Indian Ocean composed the soundtrack album and the background score, while Piyush Mishra wrote the lyrics. It was Indian Ocean's first film soundtrack and consisted of nine tracks—three songs and six instrumentals. The album was released on 15 June 2005 under the Times Music label, and in DVD format on 23 July 2005. Kashyap said he opted for the band because he "wanted to use someone away from the pollution of Mumbai kind of music, sounds that are virgin, which have an eccentricity too". K. J. Singh served as the sound producer.

The album received a generally positive response. Devdulal Das of The Times of India wrote that songs like "Bandey" "just re-established this quartet from Delhi as having a distinct sound of their own - something that most bands from India can't boast of." Bhasker Gupta of AllMusic called it a "full-blown and outright stylish contemporary and musically rich album" and wrote: "It's rare that one hears Indian classical music amalgamated with Western electric jazz and Sufi music, and this is where the beauty of this album lies."

Release
Black Friday premiered at the 2004 Locarno International Film Festival and was screened at festivals in Germany, Estonia, South Korea and the United States. It was ready for screening in India on 29 December 2005. A petition was filed by Mustaq Moosa Tarani, one of the accused, who stated the film could prejudice the case. His petition noted the final verdict in the trial had not yet been released and demanded a ban on the film until then. The Bombay High Court agreed and directed that the film not be released. Mid Day appealed to the Supreme Court, challenging the High Court's judgment. However, the court lifted the ban only after the verdicts were delivered in 2006.

Kashyap did not feel the long delay before the film's release would "impair" its impact. He said: "It's a timeless film with a universal theme of religious intolerance leading to terrorism." He said that he was getting dressed in a suit, ready for the film's premiere on the release day, when he heard of the ban. He wore the same suit for a month and went into depression. The film was released after a twenty-month ban on 9 February 2007 on 100 screens in India, 10 in the United States, and three in South Africa. The worldwide distribution rights were acquired by Adlabs Films. The film was released in DVD format on 5 April 2007 and is also available on online streaming services Hotstar and Netflix.

It won the Grand Jury Prize at the Indian Film Festival of Los Angeles, and was a nominee for the Golden Leopard (Best Film) at the 57th Locarno International Film Festival.

Critical reception
Upon its release, Black Friday received critical acclaim. Rajeev Masand gave it a positive review and said it is "one of the best" films he'd watched in recent years. He wrote: "Please don't dismiss it as a boring art film, don't confuse it for a documentary, it's a dramatic feature that will rock your boat." Prithiviraj Hegde of Rediff.com noted: "While the film stays true as a dark, brooding, evil tale, it is told with a droll, dry humour that brings a smile even as the protagonists head toward their final unforgiving denouement." Anupama Chopra said the film had "several memorable sequences" but felt it was "static" as the screenplay does not allow the "characters to evolve or engage". Taran Adarsh praised the actors' performances calling the film "hard-hitting" with "the courage to say what it says". Nikhat Kazmi called it a "powerful, pointed and hard-hitting cinema that needs to be seen."

Deepa Gahlot of Sify called it a "fabulously crafted and superbly enacted film, but not stark enough to be documentary and not fictional enough to be a feature". She felt that Kashyap tried to justify Memon's actions in the film. Rahul Desai of Film Companion wrote that the film is "more of a feeling—singularly shocking, stirring, cataclysmic, yet journalistic and depressingly objective, and one of the great achievements in Indian cinema". Baradwaj Rangan mentioned in his review that the film is a series of "superbly-orchestrated sequences" saying the "only thing you could fault it for is that it doesn't know when to stop". Namrata Joshi of Outlook called it an "audacious, daring and explosive piece of cinema". In 2014, Raja Sen called it Kashyap's "possibly best" and a "gripping, gloriously gritty film". Khalid Mohamed called the film "defiantly uncompromising" and Kashyap's direction "unbelievably mature and searching". A review carried by The Hindu cited it as "one of the finest Indian films of recent years".

Among overseas critics, Matt Zoller Seitz of The New York Times described the film as "epic and raw, and cut out from the same bloody cloth as Salvador and Munich". The Hollywood Reporters Kirk Honeycutt compared the film's "journalistic inquiry into cataclysmic social and political events" to that of Gillo Pontecorvo's The Battle of Algiers. He noted the film is objective without any "lurid sensationalism". Maitland McDonagh felt the film "humanizes the bombers without excusing their actions". She also said it "owes more to films like Munich than mainstream commercial spectacle".

David Chute of LA Weekly described it as "a rigorously naturalistic docudrama about a complex police investigation". Ethan Alter of Film Journal International called it "a potent reminder that Indian filmmaking isn't limited to Bollywood super-productions". Varietys Derek Elley called it a "fact-based procedural whose drama gets lost amid its analytical detail." A review carried by Time Out called the film a "post-9/11 food for thought and a vivid reminder not to get arrested in India, where the prisoners' bill of rights is very short".

Legacy
Black Friday is cited by several critics and film scholars as Kashyap's best work. The film was included in IBN Live's 2013 list of the 100 greatest Indian films of all time and Mint list of 70 iconic films of Indian cinema. In 2010, Raja Sen mentioned it in The Top 75 Hindi Films of the Decade list. It was included in critic and author Shubhra Gupta's book, 50 Films That Changed Bollywood, 1995-2015. Danny Boyle cited Black Friday as an inspiration for his 2008 Academy award-winning film Slumdog Millionaire. He stated that a chase in one of the opening scenes was based on a "12-minute police chase through the crowded Dharavi slum" in Black Friday. In 2014 filmmaker Vikramaditya Motwane, when asked about the most important films in last decade, replied Lage Raho Munna Bhai (2006) and Black Friday.

References

External links 
 
 
 

2004 films
Indian crime drama films
Indian crime thriller films
Indian crime action films
Indian police films
2000s Hindi-language films
Indian docudrama films
Films shot in Mumbai
Films set in India
Films set in Pakistan
Films set in the United Arab Emirates
Films set in Dubai
2004 crime drama films
2004 crime thriller films
2000s crime action films
Indian gangster films
Films set in 1993
1993 Bombay bombings
D-Company
Censorship in India
Fictional portrayals of the Maharashtra Police
Films based on non-fiction books
India–Pakistan relations in popular culture
Films set in Delhi
Films set in Mumbai
Films shot in Maharashtra
Films set in Rajasthan
Films set in Uttar Pradesh
Indian films about revenge
Films about terrorism in India
Films about corruption in India
Films about organised crime in India
Films about religious violence in India
Films directed by Anurag Kashyap
Films with screenplays by Anurag Kashyap
Films based on Indian novels
Cockfighting in film